= Minerals Yearbook =

Annual publication from the United States Geological Survey

The Minerals Yearbook is an annual publication from the United States Geological Survey. It reviews the mineral and material industries of the United States and other countries. The Minerals Yearbook contains statistical production data as well as information on economic and technical trends. First published in 1933, it was preceded by The Mineral Resources of the United States.

== Contents ==
Current issues are published in three volumes:

- Volume I – Metals and Minerals contains chapters on around 90 commercially important mined commodities
- Volume II - Area Reports: Domestic reviews mineral industry of US on a per-State basis
- Volume III - Area Reports: International reviews world mineral industry on a per-country basis
